Eduar Antonio Villanueva (born 29 December 1984) is a Venezuelan middle-distance runner. He represented his country at the 2008 Summer Olympics and 2012 Summer Olympics and has participated in the World Championships in Athletics on three consecutive occasions (2007, 2009, 2011). In 2011 he had the best ever performance by a Venezuelan runner at the World Championships, coming eighth in the 1500 metres. He set a Venezuelan record of 3:36.96 minutes in the semi-final.

In regional competition, Villanueva is a two-time bronze medallist at the South American Championships in Athletics and has won a gold medal at both the Central American and Caribbean Games and the Central American and Caribbean Championships. He was a participant at the 2007 Pan American Games.

Running career
Born in Barquisimeto, Lara, he won his first international medal at the 2004 South American Under-23 Championships held in his hometown, where he took the 5000 metres bronze medal. He ran in the 1500 metres at the 2005 Bolivarian Games and set a personal best of 3:46.32 minutes, finishing in fourth place.

The 2006 season saw him establish himself as a senior athlete. He was third in the 800 metres at the 2006 Ibero-American Championships, won his first national title over 1500 m, and represented Venezuela at the 2006 Central American and Caribbean Games. At the Games he ran two personal bests: 1:48.21 min for fifth in the 800 m and 3:44.27 min for fourth in the 1500 m. He came fifth in the 800 m in his senior continental debut at the 2006 South American Championships in Athletics. He won two medals at the 2006 South American Under-23 event, winning the 1500 m and coming a close second to Brazil's Kléberson Davide in the shorter race.

At the 2007 South American Championships in Athletics he won his first medal on the continental stage, securing the bronze medal behind Byron Piedra and Leandro de Oliveira. Villanueva was chosen to run for his nation at the 2007 Pan American Games and came sixth in the 1500 m with a personal best of 3:41.74 min and ended the competition by running an 800 m best of 1:48.05 min in the heats of that event. He gained selection for the Venezuelan team at the 2007 World Championships in Athletics held the following month and he improved his 800 m best further by running a time of 1:46.33 min in the heats.

In 2008 Villanueva made his global indoor debut at the 2008 IAAF World Indoor Championships and also ran at the Olympics for the first time, competing in the heats of the 800 m at the 2008 Beijing Games. He was the 800 m silver medallist at the 2008 Central American and Caribbean Championships, finishing behind Cuba's Andy González. At the World Military Track and Field Championships in June 2009, he came fourth in the 1500 m. Villanueva won a consecutive 1500 m bronze at the 2009 South American Championships in Athletics, but was the gold medallist in the event at the 2009 CAC Championships. He was selected to run the 800 m at the 2009 World Championships in Athletics (although he had focused on the longer distance regionally) and was eliminated in the first round.

Villanueva was runner-up to Spain's David Bustos in the 1500 m at the 2010 Ibero-American Championships. He broke José López's 14-year-old Venezuelan record in the 1500 m with a run of 3:38.96 min in Barakaldo. The 2010 CAC Games saw him beat Moise Joseph to the 800 m gold medal and finish with a silver medal in the 1500 m behind Juan Luis Barrios.

He focused more on the 1500 m in 2011 and spent much of the season based in Spain with his coach Mariano Gonzalo. Villanueva improved his 1500 m national record to 3:38.29 minutes at a meeting in Barcelona in July 2011 and gained selection for the 2011 World Championships in Athletics in Daegu, South Korea. At the competition, he qualified for the 1500 m final by running a personal best of 3:36.96 min in the semi-finals. In the final he finished in eighth place, which was the best ever performance by a Venezuelan track runner at the world championships (improving upon William Wuycke's run in 1987).

Personal bests
Outdoor
800 m: 1:46.33 min –  Osaka, 30 August 2007
1500 m: 3:36.96 min –  Daegu, 1 September 2011
3000 m: 8:13.12 min –  Valparaíso, 22 April 2007
Indoor
800 m: 1:49.75 min –  Valencia, 9 February 2008

Achievements

References

Living people
1984 births
Venezuelan male middle-distance runners
Sportspeople from Barquisimeto
Olympic athletes of Venezuela
Athletes (track and field) at the 2007 Pan American Games
Athletes (track and field) at the 2008 Summer Olympics
Athletes (track and field) at the 2011 Pan American Games
Athletes (track and field) at the 2012 Summer Olympics
Pan American Games bronze medalists for Venezuela
Pan American Games medalists in athletics (track and field)
Central American and Caribbean Games gold medalists for Venezuela
Competitors at the 2010 Central American and Caribbean Games
South American Games gold medalists for Venezuela
South American Games silver medalists for Venezuela
South American Games medalists in athletics
Competitors at the 2006 South American Games
Central American and Caribbean Games medalists in athletics
Medalists at the 2011 Pan American Games
20th-century Venezuelan people
21st-century Venezuelan people